AETR may refer to:

Advanced Engineering Test Reactor 
Advanced Epithermal Thorium Reactor 
Accord Européen sur les Transports Routiers, the European Agreement Concerning the Work of Crews of Vehicles Engaged in International Road Transport